Světlá pod Ještědem is a municipality and village in Liberec District in the Liberec Region of the Czech Republic. It has about 1,000 inhabitants.

Administrative parts
Villages of Dolení Paseky, Hodky, Hoření Paseky, Jiříčkov, Křižany, Rozstání and Vesec are administrative parts of Světlá pod Ještědem.

History

The first written mention of Světlá pod Ještědem is from 1291. The Church of Saint Nicholas was built in 1643.

References

External links

Villages in Liberec District